Bobby Eugene Nutt  (April 3, 1951 – June 8, 2017), better known by his ring name Ron Starr, was an American professional wrestler. Starr was a mainstay for numerous wrestling territories throughout the 1970s and 80s, capturing almost three dozen championships throughout his career including two reigns as NWA World Junior Heavyweight Champion and several reigns as NWA World Tag Team Champion. He was also notable for his involvement with Stampede Wrestling in Canada and his tenure with the World Wrestling Council (WWC) in Puerto Rico. Starr has been called "one of the unsung heroes of the territory days of professional wrestling" and "one of the most effective heels that  territorial professional wrestling had ever seen.

Early life
Bobby Nutt was born to parents Oscar and Betty Nutt. His love of professional wrestling came from his mother, who was a wrestling fan and would attend shows on Friday nights. In 1970 at the age of 18, Bobby enlisted in the United States Army, serving eighteen months in Vietnam. Nutt had difficulty becoming re-accustomed to American life but soon found work in the construction industry where he worked alongside his father. He was noticed at a local YMCA gym by wrestlers Buddy Colt and Billy Spears, who introduced him to the possibility of a career in professional wrestling

Professional wrestling career
Starr debuted in 1972 and soon made a name for himself working for Jim Crockett Promotions in the National Wrestling Alliance, primarily in the Mid-Atlantic and Championship Wrestling From Florida territories. He travelled extensively throughout his career, making his New Japan Pro-Wrestling debut in 1976 and accumulating championships in various territories throughout the Gulf Coast, Central States, San Francisco, Pacific Northwest, Los Angeles, Tri-States Stampede, Atlantic Grand Prix and Puerto Rico. During his tenures in Japan, China and South Africa, he primarily wrestled under the ring name "Ron Starr."

Throughout the 1970s and 80s, Starr was a prolific traveler throughout the territory system. He captured singles and tag team championships in Central States, Gulf Coast, Pacific Northwest, Texas and Southeastern territories and won several NWA world championships, including two reigns as NWA World Junior Heavyweight champion, beating Pat Barrett in 1976, and then Les Thornton in a tournament in 1980.

Starr had perhaps one of his best-remembered runs during his tenure with Stampede Wrestling in Calgary, where he was a two-time Stampede Tag Team Championship as one-half of the tag-team “Memphis Mafia.” alongside Wayne Ferris (aka the Honky Tonk Man).

Having wrestled several tours for New Japan between 1976 and 1980, Starr spent the later part of the wrestling career from 1987 wrestling overseas for New Japan and the World Wrestling Council in Puerto Rico until 1997. In the WWC, he captured 12 titles including being a two-time Junior Heavyweight Champion, four time World Tag Team Champion, three time North American Tag Team Champion and two time Television Champion 

In 1997, Starr retired from wrestling.

Later life and death
In his later life, Starr published his autobiography, titled "Bad to the Bone: 25 Years of Riots and Wrestling". The book was reviewed by Marty Goldstein of SLAM! Sports, who called it "an essential volume for any true fan of the business" due to its concise detailing of the territory system. The book was forwarded by Mick Foley, who credits Starr with teaching him the art of "brawling" in wrestling, during their 1989 feud.

According to Rock Rims (who worked with Starr on his autobiography) Starr had suffered four heart attacks and four strokes in the last two decades of his life. Starr died on June 8, 2017, and was found by his wife that morning at 6:20 am, having died in his sleep, reportedly of a collapsed lung.

Championships and accomplishments 
All-South Wrestling Alliance
ASWA Georgia Tag Team Championship (1 time) - with Randy Rose
Atlantic Grand Prix Wrestling
 AGPW International Heavyweight Championship (3 times)
NWA Hollywood Wrestling
 NWA Americas Heavyweight Championship (1 time)
National Wrestling Alliance
 NWA World Junior Heavyweight Championship (2 times)
 NWA Central States Heavyweight Championship (1 time)
 NWA Central States Tag Team Championship (1 time) - with Tom Andrews)
 NWA World Tag Team Championship (San Francisco version) (2 times) - with Dean Ho (1) and Enrique Vera (1)
 NWA World Tag Team Championship (Los Angeles version) (1 time) - with The Hood 	
 NWA United States Heavyweight Championship (San Francisco version) (3 times)
 NWA Gulf Coast Tag Team Championship (1 time) - with Terry Lathan
 NWA Pacific Northwest Tag Team Championship (1 time) - with Adrian Adonis
 NWA Southeastern Tag Team Championship (Northern Division) (1 time) - with Wayne Ferris
Stampede Wrestling
 Stampede International Tag Team Championship (2 times) - with Wayne Ferris)
 Stampede British Commonwealth Mid-Heavyweight Championship (1 time)
World Wrestling Council
 WWC World Junior Heavyweight Championship (2 times)
 WWC World Tag Team Championship (4 times) - with Chicky Starr (2), Cuban Assassin (1) and Doug Masters (1)
 WWC North American Tag Team Championship (3 times) - with Chicky Starr
 WWC Television Championship (2 times)
 WWC Caribbean Tag Team Championship (1 time) - with Cuban Assassin
United States Wrestling Association
USWA Tag Team Championship (1 time) - with Sheik Braddock
WSA
 WSA Tag Team Championship (3 times)

Luchas de Apuestas record

References

External links 
 

1950 births
2017 deaths
20th-century professional wrestlers
American male professional wrestlers
Professional wrestlers from Georgia (U.S. state)
USWA World Tag Team Champions
WWC Television Champions
NWA World Junior Heavyweight Champions
Stampede Wrestling British Commonwealth Mid-Heavyweight Champions
Stampede Wrestling International Tag Team Champions
NWA Americas Heavyweight Champions